The Link is an American documentary television program, hosted by Josh Klein, that aired on National Geographic Channel in 2012. The program examines the history and advances leading up to a given modern technology in each episode.

Overview
Each episode presents the technology that is the topic of the day. Then a series of historic events and inventions are outlined during the show, in a narrative by Klein, leading to the production of that technology.

Episodes
 Swords to Spy Planes
 Aqueducts to Oil Rigs
 Fireworks to Forensics
 Ploughs to Supercars
 Waterwheels to Mega Jets

External links
 The Link, main page on National Geographic
 

2010s American documentary television series
2012 American television series debuts